The 1998 East Carolina Pirates football team was an American football team that represented East Carolina University as a member of Conference USA during the 1998 NCAA Division I-A football season. In their seventh season under head coach Steve Logan, the team compiled a 6–5 record. The Pirates offense scored 274 points while the defense allowed 297 points.

Schedule

References

East Carolina
East Carolina Pirates football seasons
East Carolina Pirates football